Coleridge Community College is a secondary academy school with 750 places for children aged 11–16, situated on Radegund Road, Cambridge, Cambridgeshire, England. The school is a member of the United Learning Cambridge Cluster (formerly the Parkside Federation and the Cambridge Academic Partnership) along with Parkside Community College, Trumpington Community College, Cambridge Academy for Science and Technology (formerly UTC Cambridge), and Parkside Sixth.  It joined Parkside Community College to form the Parkside Federation in 2005, after having been placed in special measures in 2003.  An Ofsted report in 2019 rated it as good, under the leadership of Headteacher, Mark Patterson. Cambridge Academic Partnership joined the United Learning academy as a unit in September 2019.

Originally two segregated schools, the Coleridge Secondary Modern School for Boys was located in the right half and the Coleridge Secondary Modern School for Girls in the left half of the mirror-image twin main building, with a separate dedicated gymnasium located behind the Girls' school, and prefabricated classroom outbuildings surrounding its internal playing fields at the rear of the Boys' school. The two schools were merged into a Comprehensive School from the 1966 school year as part of the national reorganisation of secondary and grammar schools.

Notable alumni 
 Louis Rolfe, British Paralympic track cyclist
Michael Heaver, Brexit Party MEP
Leon Davies, Cambridge United Football Club Defender
Catherine Banner, Author

Media attention 
In December 2021, the school was noticed by local news channels after numerous complaints from parents and students (current and former) . The article brought insight on a student-made petition on Change.org claiming the school had transformed from a 'safe haven' to a 'negative environment which resembles a prison', asking for these 'derogatory rules to be demonised' (The meaning of this is unclear). It also interviewed a local parent, who described the school as a 'camp' due to the fact children were given report cards. ITV Anglia's Joanna MacKenzie also interviewed a former student who stated 'You always felt like you were doing something wrong'. Daniel Zeichner, the Labour Party UK MP for Cambridge spoke out and said "I found some of the attitudes of the trust hard to take. It was very much 'this is United Learning’s approach and that's the way it is'". A United Learning spokesperson for the college described the behaviour policy to have been 'successfully put in place' but acknowledged that local parents are 'entitled to complain'. The article also explored how the behaviour policy is present in many other schools, particularly those in academies, in line with the values of the Department for Education.

References

External links
 Parkside Federation website
 Cambridgeshire County Council Admissions website

Schools in Cambridge
Academies in Cambridgeshire
Secondary schools in Cambridgeshire
United Learning schools